Lost in the 80s is the first studio album by Canadian gypsy jazz band the Lost Fingers, released in Quebec on 6 May 2008 and in the remainder of Canada on 27 January 2009. The album consists entirely of the band's renditions of selected popular songs from the 1980s. English lyrics are performed through all tracks on the album except for "Incognito", a French-language song initially performed by Celine Dion.

Awards and recognition
During its Quebec release alone, the album sold over 100 000 units earning platinum certification. It was nominated as Album of the Year for the 2009 Juno Awards.

Track listing

* The bonus tracks were only available in the 2009 Canada-wide release.

Personnel

The Lost Fingers

 Alex Morissette – backing vocals, double bass
 Christian Roberge – lead vocals, guitar
 Byron Mikaloff – guitar

Charts

Weekly charts

Year-end charts

Release history

References

External links
 The Lost Fingers official site

2008 debut albums
The Lost Fingers albums
Covers albums